"I Had a Good Father and Mother" is a 1929 gospel blues song by Washington Phillips (18801954, vocals and zither). The song has sometimes been covered as "I Had a Good Mother and Father"; or with, in both cases, "Real" inserted before "Good".

Unusually, the song does not have a conventional refrain; instead, the verses are separated by a wordless vocalise.

The final verse reflects a concept mentioned several times in the Gospel of John:
A new commandment I give unto you, That ye love one another; as I have loved you, that ye also love one another.John 13:34
As the Father hath loved me, so have I loved you: continue ye in my love.John 15:9
This is my commandment, That ye love one another, as I have loved you.John 15:12

The recording history suggests that the song was composed by Phillips himself: there seems to be no earlier or contemporary version, nor any cover version until 64 years after his recording of the song.

Recordings 

 1929Washington Phillips, 10" 78rpm single Columbia 14566-D
 1993Palace Brothers on the album There Is No-One What Will Take Care of You
 1994Kate Wolf on the album Looking Back at You 
 2003Gillian Welch on the album Soul Journey
 2004Paul Rishell and Annie Raines on the album Goin' Home 
 2016The Lower Lights on the album A Hymn Revival, Vol. 3

References 

Blues songs
Gospel songs
Washington Phillips songs
1929 songs
Columbia Records singles
Songs about fathers
Songs about mothers